Alfredo Rolando Prieto (November 18, 1965 – October 1, 2015) was a Salvadoran-American serial killer. After being initially convicted for a single murder, he would later be connected to eight other murders committed in Virginia and California between May 1988 and September 1990 via DNA profiling. Sentenced to death in both states, Prieto was executed by lethal injection in Virginia in 2015.

Biography 
Alfredo Prieto was born on November 18, 1965, in San Martín, San Salvador, El Salvador to parents Arnoldo and Teodora Prieto, who had five other children. He spent his childhood and adolescence in poverty, since his parents experienced heavy financial difficulties during the Football War. Prieto's mother left El Salvador in 1975 due to her husband’s abuse and emigrated to the United States. During the outbreak of the Salvadoran Civil War, Alfredo reportedly witnessed many civilians being killed, including his grandfather. Prieto would subsequently be diagnosed with PTSD.

In 1981, his mother retrieved her children from El Salvador, settling in Pomona, California, where Alfredo and his siblings attended Pomona High School. During high school, Prieto became addicted to drugs and alcohol. Around this time, he and his brother Guillermo met Sandra Figueroa, whose brothers were members of a local street gang named "456 Island Piru.” Prieto joined the gang, dropped out of school and married Figueroa. The couple had a child in 1984. In August 1984, Prieto shot three people in Ontario, claiming his wife supposedly cheated on him with one of the wounded men. His wife later said that Prieto subjected her to sexual abuse and aggression, which he denied.

In late 1984, he was found guilty of the shootings, but since his victims were also gang members, the court showed leniency to him. He received a minor sentence and was released in 1987, after which he left California and moved to Virginia. He settled in Arlington County, Virginia, where his father had also moved to after emigrating to the US after serving a murder conviction in El Salvador. Once in Arlington, Prieto found a job and met another girl, who later bore him a son. At the end of 1989, his father was arrested for raping a woman and was jailed. In February 1990, Prieto left the state and moved back to California.

Murder of Yvette Woodruff 
Early in the morning of September 2, 1990, Prieto, along with 29-year-old Vincent Lopez and 33-year-old Danny Sorian, robbed Anthony Rangela in Ontario. They then took him hostage and drove to his house, where Rangela lived with his 33-year-old aunt Emily D., her 17-year-old daughter Lisa H. and Lisa's friend, 15-year-old Yvette Woodruff. They kidnapped the women and drove to the outskirts of the city, but along the way, Lopez refused to participate any further and left the car. He was replaced by another friend of Prieto's, Ricardo Estrada, whom they came across while buying gasoline at a gas station. They raped the women in an abandoned building in an industrial zone on the eastern outskirts of the city. Prieto shot and killed Woodruff, while Sorian and Estrada stabbed Emily D. and Lisa H. before leaving the scene. Despite severe injuries and extensive blood loss, Emily D. and Lisa H. survived and managed to call the police. They were taken to the hospital, where they testified about the attack. On that same day, the police found Woodruff's body, and a few days later, the car which the criminals had used.

Prieto and his accomplices were discovered after street informants learned about the crime and contacted the authorities. Police swiftly arrested Prieto and the others involved between September 6–22, 1990. A pistol belonging to one of the victims was found at Prieto’s apartment and determined to be the murder weapon.

Trials and exposure 
Prieto was later charged with first degree murder, rape, kidnapping and robbery. By jury verdict, he was found guilty on January 21, 1992, on all charges, receiving the death sentence. Twelve days later, he was transferred to San Quentin State Prison, where he would spend the next 14 years awaiting execution on death row.

In 2005, a law was passed obligating all convicts in the state to submit their DNA, resulting in Prieto's DNA being entered into the national database.

In early 2006, Prieto's DNA was matched to eight more murders committed between 1988 and 1990: the 1988 rape and murder of 24-year-old Veronica "Tina" Lynn Jefferson in Arlington, the murder of 22-year-old Rachael Raver and her 22-year-old fiancé, Warren Fulton III, in Reston; and the 1989 murder of 27-year-old Manuel Sermeno in Prince William County near I-95.

On May 5, 1990, Prieto was shown to have killed 19-year-old Stacey Siegrist and her 21-year-old fiancé, Tony Gianuzzi, in Rubidoux, California. Siegrist was sexually assaulted before being shot.

On June 2, 1990, Prieto killed Lula Mae Farley in an alley behind an Ontario supermarket where she and her husband were collecting recyclables, according to 1990 news coverage. After witnessing the murder of his wife, Herbert Farley was then abducted and later found shot to death in Rubidoux. Another individual, 19-year-old Steven Valdez, was arrested as a suspect in these killings, but later released.

Following these revelations, the Fairfax County Attorney's Office brought a number of charges against Alfredo Prieto, resulting in his extradition from San Quentin on April 28, 2006, to Virginia, where he was due to stand trial.

The trial began in 2007, with Prieto represented by Peter Greenspun and Jonathan Shapiro. He was found guilty by a jury of the Raver-Fulton murders, receiving a second death sentence. After the conviction, a juror claimed that, at the end of the sentencing stage, he had been pressured into voting for the death penalty by the prosecutor's office,  despite his reservations.

Prieto's lawyers filed an appeal, which was upheld, overturning his sentence and ordering a new trial to be held. However, he was found guilty and sentenced to death again.

A year later, his lawyers filed another appeal to overturn his sentence and asking for a new trial, based on the results from a psychiatric exam which determined that their client was intellectually disabled, with an IQ threshold between 67 and 73. Their petition was accepted, but at the third trial, the prosecutor's office proved to the court that Prieto had been a successful student at school in both El Salvador and the United States, and that he had adapted socially, had perfectly learned the English language, was popular and obtained a driver's license in both Virginia and California, which contradicted the notions of an intellectual disability. He was sentenced to death for a third and final time in 2010.

Execution 
On October 1, 2015, Prieto was executed by lethal injection at the Greensville Correctional Center at 9:17 p.m., in the presence of state witnesses and some of the victims' family members. Shortly before his execution, his lawyers filed a lawsuit to delay the execution date on the grounds that drugs used for the process were unsafe. They demanded information about the shelf life of pentobarbital, which the state had received from Texas in exchange for another sedative, midazolam, which had expired. Among other things, his lawyers sought to force the state to disclose the name of the pharmaceutical company producing the drug in order to determine its quality so they could prevent the physical torture of their client during the execution, but this suit was dismissed.

See also 
 List of people executed in Virginia
 List of people executed in the United States in 2015
 List of serial killers in the United States
 Kelvin Malone, sentenced to death in California but executed in a different state

References

External links 
 The People v. Prieto
 Prieto v. Zook
 Prieto v. Davis
 Execution Summary

1965 births
2015 deaths
20th-century American criminals
21st-century executions by Virginia
American male criminals
American murderers of children
American people convicted of attempted murder
American people convicted of kidnapping
American people convicted of rape
American people convicted of robbery
American rapists
Executed American serial killers
Male serial killers
Prisoners sentenced to death by California
People convicted of murder by California
People convicted of murder by Virginia
People executed by Virginia by lethal injection
People from San Salvador Department
Salvadoran emigrants to the United States
Salvadoran serial killers
Salvadoran people imprisoned abroad
Salvadoran people convicted of murder
Executed Salvadoran people